The 2002 NASCAR Craftsman Truck Series was the eighth season of the Craftsman Truck Series, the third highest stock car racing series sanctioned by NASCAR in the United States. Mike Bliss of Xpress Motorsports was crowned the champion at season's end.

2002 teams and drivers

Full-time teams

Part-time teams
Note: If under "team", the owner's name is listed and in italics, that means the name of the race team that fielded the truck is unknown.

Notes

Races

Florida Dodge Dealers 250

The Florida Dodge Dealers 250 was held February 15 at Daytona International Speedway. Ted Musgrave won the pole. Terry Cook suffered a 100-point penalty for a cylinder head infraction found in his truck after the race.

Top ten results

18-Robert Pressley*
1-Ted Musgrave
4-Brian Rose
79-Joe Ruttman
6-Rick Carelli
29-Terry Cook
75-David Starr
43-Carlos Contreras
07-Jason Small
90-Lance Norick

This was Pressley's first truck series victory. This race was also Pressley's truck series debut. There was a multiple truck wreck when Travis Kvapil got turned hard into the wall in which Matt Crafton nearly flipped on his roof.

Failed to qualify: Mike Swaim Jr. (#56), Jim Inglebright (#02), Trent Owens (#15), Ryan McGlynn (#00), Michael Dokken (#51), Ken Allen (#28), Ron Barfield Jr. (#97), Stan Boyd (#89), Morgan Shepherd (#21), Jerry Hill (#41), Jake Hobgood (#31)

Craftsman Anniversary 200

The Craftsman Anniversary 200 was March 15 at Darlington Raceway. Jason Leffler won the pole.

Top ten results

1-Ted Musgrave
18-Robert Pressley
16-Mike Bliss
6-Kevin Harvick
14-Rick Crawford
75-David Starr
60-Travis Kvapil
4-Brian Rose
50-Jon Wood
52-Ken Schrader

Failed to qualify: Mike Swaim Jr. (#56), Ron Barfield Jr. (#97), Rodney Sawyers (#68), Mike Harmon (#93), Ricky Sanders (#19), Phil Bonifield (#23)

Advance Auto Parts 250

The Advance Auto Parts 250 was held April 13 at Martinsville Speedway. Ted Musgrave won the pole. The race is best known for a caution: Kevin Harvick intentionally turned Coy Gibbs around for previous contact and NASCAR instantly parked him. In the post-race interview Harvick lied that he did not intentionally crash Gibbs even though it was heard on the radio; he was banned from the cup race the next day.

Top ten results

46-Dennis Setzer
16-Mike Bliss
14-Rick Crawford
08-Bobby Dotter
29-Terry Cook
2-Jason Leffler
60-Travis Kvapil
75-David Starr
62-Brendan Gaughan
50-Jon Wood

Failed to qualify: Steve Portenga (#39), L. W. Miller (#28), Brian Sockwell (#54), Dana White (#86), Tommy Pistone (#59), Jody McCormick (#77), Jerry Allec Jr. (#93), Vince Whitmire (#40), James Stephenson (#36), Bobby Coffey (#74), R. D. Smith (#41)

Missouri-Illinois Dodge Dealers Ram Tough 200

The Missouri-Illinois Dodge Dealers Ram Tough 200 was held May 5 at Gateway International Raceway. Mike Bliss won the pole.

Top ten results

29-Terry Cook*
2-Jason Leffler
16-Mike Bliss
14-Rick Crawford
75-David Starr
46-Dennis Setzer
50-Jon Wood
4-Brian Rose
90-Lance Norick
88-Matt Crafton

Failed to qualify: R.D. Smith (#41), Aaron Daniel (#11), Phil Bonifield (#23), Scott Kuhn (#49)

This race was Terry Cook's first truck series win since 1998.

Rocky Mountain 200 presented by Dodge

The Rocky Mountain 200 presented by Dodge was held May 19 at Pikes Peak International Raceway. Jason Leffler won the pole.

Top ten results

16-Mike Bliss
2-Jason Leffler
60-Travis Kvapil
29-Terry Cook
75-David Starr
14-Rick Crawford
46-Dennis Setzer
39-Steve Portenga
20-Coy Gibbs
4-Brian Rose

Failed to qualify: Ricky Sanders (#19), Bobby Coffey (#74)

MBNA America 200

The MBNA America 200 was held May 31 at Dover International Speedway. Rick Crawford won the pole.

Top ten results

1-Ted Musgrave
18-Robert Pressley
14-Rick Crawford
75-David Starr
16-Mike Bliss
20-Coy Gibbs
62-Brendan Gaughan
03-Tom Carey
2-Jason Leffler
29-Terry Cook

Failed to qualify: Donnie Neuenberger (#86), Phil Bonifield (#23), Loni Richardson (#73), Bobby Coffey (#74)

O'Reilly 400K

The O'Reilly 400K was held June 7 at Texas Motor Speedway. Jason Leffler won the pole.

Top ten results

62-Brendan Gaughan
60-Travis Kvapil
75-David Starr
14-Rick Crawford
1-Ted Musgrave
18-Robert Pressley
88-Matt Crafton
20-Coy Gibbs
50-Jon Wood
90-Lance Norick

Failed to qualify: none

O'Reilly Auto Parts 200

The O'Reilly Auto Parts 200 was held June 22 at Memphis Motorsports Park. Jason Leffler won the pole. Carl Edwards, the 2007 Nationwide Series champion, makes his first truck series start. Edwards started 16th and finished in the 23rd position, 2 laps down. This was his first of seven truck races he made in the 2002 season.

Top ten results

60-Travis Kvapil
29-Terry Cook
1-Ted Musgrave
2-Jason Leffler
46-Dennis Setzer
15-Rich Bickle
75-David Starr
20-Coy Gibbs
14-Rick Crawford
4-Brian Rose

Failed to qualify: Aaron Daniel (#11), Joe Cooksey (#59), Jody McCormick (#77), Eric Jones (#34), Nathan Wulff (#65), Loni Richardson (#0), Bobby Coffey (#74), David Hall (#73), James Stephenson (#36), Blake Mallory (#37)

GNC Live Well 200

The GNC Live Well 200 was held June 29 at The Milwaukee Mile. Terry Cook won the pole.

Top ten results

29-Terry Cook
2-Jason Leffler
20-Coy Gibbs
62-Brendan Gaughan
1-Ted Musgrave
75-David Starr
18-Robert Pressley
16-Mike Bliss
50-Jon Wood
60-Travis Kvapil

Failed to qualify: Loni Richardson (#0), Aaron Daniel (#11)

O'Reilly Auto Parts 250

The O'Reilly Auto Parts 250 was held July 6 at Kansas Speedway. Jason Leffler won the pole.

Top ten results

16-Mike Bliss
46-Dennis Setzer
20-Coy Gibbs
2-Jason Leffler
1-Ted Musgrave
29-Terry Cook
18-Robert Pressley
63-Carl Edwards
50-Jon Wood
88-Matt Crafton

Failed to qualify: Lonnie Cox (#66), Loni Richardson (#0), David Hall (#73)

Kroger 225

The Kroger 225 was held July 13 at Kentucky Speedway. Jason Leffler won the pole.

Top ten results

16-Mike Bliss
46-Dennis Setzer
18-Robert Pressley
14-Rick Crawford
2-Jason Leffler
29-Terry Cook
20-Coy Gibbs
75-David Starr
1-Ted Musgrave
39-Steve Portenga

Failed to qualify: Morgan Shepherd (#21), Rodney Sawyers (#68), Vince Whitmire (#40), Dana White (#86), Lonnie Cox (#66), Ricky Sanders (#19), Tom Powers (#55), David Hall (#73), Loni Richardson (#0)

New England 200

The New England 200 was held July 20 at New Hampshire International Speedway. Jason Leffler won the pole.

Top ten results

29-Terry Cook
46-Dennis Setzer
75-David Starr
1-Ted Musgrave
62-Brendan Gaughan
20-Coy Gibbs
60-Travis Kvapil
6-Kevin Harvick
18-Robert Pressley
16-Mike Bliss

Failed to qualify: none

Michigan 200

The Michigan 200 was held July 27 at Michigan International Speedway. Ted Musgrave won the pole.

Top ten results

18-Robert Pressley
2-Jason Leffler
60-Travis Kvapil
16-Mike Bliss
75-David Starr
29-Terry Cook
20-Coy Gibbs
90-Lance Norick
14-Rick Crawford
50-Jon Wood

Failed to qualify: none

Power Stroke Diesel 200

The Power Stroke Diesel 200 was held August 2 at Indianapolis Raceway Park. Terry Cook won the pole.

Top ten results

29-Terry Cook
2-Jason Leffler
60-Travis Kvapil
52-Mike Wallace
18-Robert Pressley
17-Darrell Waltrip
90-Lance Norick
50-Jon Wood
08-Bobby Dotter
88-Matt Crafton

Failed to qualify: Dude Teate (#31), Clay Collier (#41), Jay Sherston (#30), Bobby Coffey (#74), Tom Powers (#55)

Federated Auto Parts 200

The Federated Auto Parts 200 was held August 10 at Nashville Superspeedway. Mike Bliss won the pole.

Top ten results

16-Mike Bliss
14-Rick Crawford
1-Ted Musgrave
4-Bobby Hamilton Jr.
46-Dennis Setzer
62-Brendan Gaughan
29-Terry Cook
50-Jon Wood
18-Robert Pressley
2-Mike Wallace

Failed to qualify: Tom Powers (#55), Phil Bonifield (#23)

Richmond Is For Lovers 200

The Richmond Is For Lovers 200 was held September 5 at Richmond International Raceway. Jason Leffler won the pole. Bobby Hamilton sustained injuries in this race that caused him to miss several races of the 2002 Winston Cup season.

Top ten results

33-Tony Stewart
6-Kevin Harvick
16-Mike Bliss
14-Rick Crawford
29-Terry Cook
20-Coy Gibbs
1-Ted Musgrave
17-Stacy Compton
08-Bobby Dotter
52-Ken Schrader

Failed to qualify: Stan Boyd (#89), Brad Bennett (#40), Dana White (#23), Clay Collier (#41), Loni Richardson (#73), Tommy Pistone (#59), James Stephenson (#36), Jody McCormick (#77), Bobby Coffey (#74), Conrad Burr (#28)

Silverado 350

The Silverado 350 was held September 13 at Texas Motor Speedway. Mike Bliss won the pole.

Top ten results

62-Brendan Gaughan
20-Coy Gibbs
75-David Starr
14-Rick Crawford
60-Travis Kvapil
1-Ted Musgrave
18-Robert Pressley
2-Jason Leffler
16-Mike Bliss
46-Dennis Setzer

Failed to qualify: none

John Boy & Billy's Hardee's 250

The John Boy & Billy's Hardee's 250 was held September 21 at South Boston Speedway. Ted Musgrave won the pole.

Top ten results

16-Mike Bliss
46-Dennis Setzer
14-Rick Crawford
20-Coy Gibbs
60-Travis Kvapil
50-Jon Wood
75-David Starr
08-Bobby Dotter
2-Jason Leffler
4-Ryan Hemphill

Failed to qualify: Jeremy Thompson (#92), Dude Teate (#31), Jay Sherston (#30), Bobby Coffey (#74), James Stephenson (#36)

Las Vegas 350

The Las Vegas 350 was held October 13 at Las Vegas Motor Speedway. David Starr won the pole.

Top ten results

75-David Starr
16-Mike Bliss
46-Dennis Setzer
60-Travis Kvapil
2-Jason Leffler
14-Rick Crawford
18-Robert Pressley
62-Brendan Gaughan
1-Ted Musgrave
07-Jason Small

Failed to qualify: Jerry Allec Jr. (#93), Tom Powers (#55)

American Racing Wheels 200

The American Racing Wheels 200 was held November 2 at California Speedway. David Starr won the pole.

Top ten results

1-Ted Musgrave
2-Jason Leffler
62-Brendan Gaughan
60-Travis Kvapil
14-Rick Crawford
20-Coy Gibbs
18-Robert Pressley
46-Dennis Setzer
16-Mike Bliss
29-Terry Cook

Failed to qualify: Bobby Hillis Jr. (#05)

Chevy Silverado 150

The Chevy Silverado 150 was held November 8 at Phoenix International Raceway. Rick Crawford won the pole.

Top ten results

6-Kevin Harvick
1-Ted Musgrave
14-Rick Crawford
60-Travis Kvapil
29-Terry Cook
20-Coy Gibbs
52-Ken Schrader
46-Dennis Setzer
88-Matt Crafton
16-Mike Bliss

Failed to qualify: Clay Collier (#41), Lonnie Cox (#66), Ricky Sanders (#19), Loni Richardson (#0), John Mickel (#09), Bobby Hillis Jr. (#05)

Ford 200

The Ford 200 was held November 15 at Homestead-Miami Speedway. Mike Bliss won the pole.

Top ten results

11-Ron Hornaday Jr.
1-Ted Musgrave
2-Jason Leffler
18-Robert Pressley
16-Mike Bliss
46-Dennis Setzer
14-Rick Crawford
75-David Starr
88-Matt Crafton
29-Terry Cook

Failed to qualify: Robby Benton (#36), Adam Clarke (#45), Cory Kruseman (#98), Phil Bonifield (#25), Loni Richardson (#0), John Mickel (#09), Dana White (#23)

 This was the last NASCAR race broadcast on ESPN in any of NASCAR's top three series until 2007.

Full Drivers' Championship

(key) Bold – Pole position awarded by time. Italics – Pole position set by owner's points. * – Most laps led.

Rookie of the Year 

Brendan Gaughan captured two wins and the Rookie of the Year title in 2002, driving for his family-owned Orleans Racing team. Bill Lester came in second followed by Jason Small. Loni Richardson also declared for the award, but did not compete in enough races to be eligible for rookie points.

See also 
 2002 NASCAR Winston Cup Series
 2002 NASCAR Busch Series

External links 
Truck Series Standings and Statistics for 2002

NASCAR Truck Series seasons